Micaela Portilla (1922–2005) was a Spanish anthropologist. She was born in Vitoria in July 1922 and died on October 8, 2005. She was one of the most important Basque anthropologists and historians of the twentieth century, having led many studies and other works in these fields through more sensitive and comprehensive methodological work. She has virtually created a school of followers in the province of Álava.

Education and career
Micaela Portilla began her professional career as an elementary and vocational school teacher in various locations in the province of Álava (Aramaiona and Salvatierra) and finally in Vitoria. She later extended her studies at the Complutense University, majoring in Geography and History. For her thesis in 1954, she presented a work entitled Torres de Mendozas, Guevaras y Ayalas en Álava (The towers of Mendoza, Guevara and Ayala in Álava), which put a starting point to her later investigative work.

The importance of her ethnographic contributions is such that Eusko Ikaskuntza and the Real Sociedad de Amigos (Royal Society of Friends) of the Basque Country organized a conference in honor of Micaela Portilla in February 2007 with the participation of the Sancho el Sabio Foundation, the Provincial Council of Álava and the City Council of Vitoria. In that conference there was an exhibition about the author and several days of conferences.

Works
Micaela Portilla's documentary work and editorial legacy contains thousands of pages and over a hundred publications, some of which are:
Torres de Mendozas, Guevaras y Ayalas en Álava (1954) - The towers of Mendoza, Guevara and Ayala in Álava.
El retablo de San Blas de Hueto Abajo (Álava) (1958) - The altarpiece of San Blas de Hueto Abajo.
Torres y casas fuertes de Álava (1978) - Towers and fortified houses in Alava.
Una ruta europea. Por Álava a Compostela. Del paso de San Adrián al Ebro (1991) - A European route. From Álava to Compostela. From the San Adrian de Ebro passage.
Catálogo Monumental. Diócesis de Vitoria (9 volumes) (1967-2007) - Monumental Catalog. Diocese of Vitoria.

Awards and recognition
Lekuona Manuel Award (1997)
Art History Studies Paper in memory of Professor Michelle Portilla (Jose Javier Velez Chaurri, Pedro Luis Echeverria Goñi and Felicitas Martínez Salinas Entertainment), Department of Culture of the Provincial Council of Alava (2009) 
Lan Onari distinction granted by the Basque Government in 2000 in recognition of his professional work.

Spanish anthropologists
1922 births
2005 deaths
Spanish women anthropologists
20th-century anthropologists
People from Vitoria-Gasteiz
Basque women
Complutense University of Madrid alumni